Sumqayit State University, sometimes written as Sumgayit State University, or Sumgait State University, is a public university in Sumqayit, Azerbaijan.

Founded in 1962, it operated as a remote branch of the Azerbaijan State Oil Academy until 1992 when it became independent as the Azerbaijani Industrial Institute. On June 13, 2000, it was renamed into Sumgayit State University.

More than 3500 students are trained for bachelor's degrees in 17 directions and 200 students for master's degrees in 28 specialties in seven departments: Mechanics-mathematics, Physics and Electrical Power Engineering, Chemistry, Computer Techniques and Technologies, Economy, History, and Philology.

Sumgayit State University is the main university of Sumgayit, the third biggest city in Azerbaijan.

Affiliations
The university is a member of the Caucasus University Association.

References

External links
Sumqayit State University website

Universities in Azerbaijan
Educational institutions established in 1961
2000 establishments in Azerbaijan